The 2021 CONCACAF Gold Cup was the 16th edition of the CONCACAF Gold Cup, the biennial international men's soccer championship of the North, Central American, and Caribbean region organized by CONCACAF.

The tournament was originally scheduled to be held from 2 through July 25, 2021, but was later rescheduled for July 10 through August 1. Mexico were the defending champions. For the first time, the video assistant referee (VAR) system was used at the tournament.

The United States won their seventh Gold Cup title by defeating Mexico 1–0 in the final.

Qualified teams

Twelve teams qualified directly via the 2019–20 CONCACAF Nations League. These were the four group winners of League A, four group runners-up of League A and the four group winners of League B.

Furthermore, twelve teams were entered into the 2021 CONCACAF Gold Cup qualification tournament (GCQ), also based on the results of the 2019–20 CONCACAF Nations League. These teams were the four group third-placed teams of League A, the four group runners-up of League B, and the four group winners of League C.

In the original format as announced in September 2019, four teams were to advance out of the GCQ.  However, in September 2020, CONCACAF announced that 2019 AFC Asian Cup champions and 2022 FIFA World Cup hosts Qatar would participate as a guest in the 2021 and 2023 tournaments. Consequently, just three teams qualified for the 2021 edition via the qualifiers.

On July 9, 2021, CONCACAF announced that Curaçao, which had originally qualified as the 2019–20 CONCACAF Nations League A Group D runners-up, would not participate in the tournament because of its high number of COVID-19 cases. They were replaced in Group A by Guatemala, the next-highest ranked team in qualifying.

Venues
On April 13, 2021, CONCACAF announced that the final would take place on August 1, 2021, at Allegiant Stadium in Paradise, Nevada, United States. On April 22, CONCACAF confirmed the tournament would be held across 9 cities in the U.S.

Final draw
The group stage draw took place in Miami, Florida on September 28, 2020, 20:00 EDT (UTC−4), along with the draw for the preliminary round. This was the first ever group stage draw for the Gold Cup. The teams were split into four pots based on the CONCACAF Rankings of August 2020. The four teams of Pot 1 were automatically seeded, with Mexico in Group A, the United States in Group B, Costa Rica in Group C and Honduras in Group D. Guests Qatar were placed in Pot 4 and pre-drawn into Group D, which began play on the latest date, as they were also slated to participate in the 2021 Copa América prior to the Gold Cup before subsequently withdrawing from that tournament.

Seeding
The following was the composition of the draw pots (pots were based on the August 2020 CONCACAF Rankings, and teams in italics are prelim winners whose identity was not known at the time of the seeding):

Draw results and group fixtures
The draw resulted in the following groups (teams in italics are prelim winners whose identity was not known at the time of the draw):

Squads

Each team had to submit a list of 23 players, of which 3 players must be goalkeepers.

Match officials
On June 29, 2021, CONCACAF announced a total of 19 referees, 25 assistant referees and 12 video assistant referees (VAR) appointed for the tournament. In addition, the CONCACAF Referee Committee approved the participation of 12 referees from CONCACAF's Targeted Advanced Referee Program (TARP) who trained with elite officials in order to prepare for future competitions.

Gambian referee Bakary Gassama and Senegalese assistant referee Djibril Camará participated in the tournament as part of a referee exchange between the Confederation of African Football and CONCACAF. Originally, the African refereeing team was also conformed by referee Maguette N'Diaye and assistant referee El Hadji Malick Samba, both from Senegal. However, these two officials had problems with their visas, preventing them from traveling.

Referees

 Drew Fischer
 Ricardo Montero
 Juan Gabriel Calderón
 Bakary Gassama
 Reon Radix
 Mario Escobar
 Bryan López
 Selvin Brown
 Said Martínez 
 Oshane Nation
 Daneon Parchment
 Adonai Escobedo
 Fernando Guerrero
 Fernando Hernández 
 César Ramos
 Iván Barton
 Ismael Cornejo
 Jair Marrufo
 Armando Villarreal
 Ismail Elfath

Assistant referees

 Iroots Appleton
 Micheal Barwegen
 William Arrieta
 Juan Carlos Mora
 Gerson López
 Walter López
 Christian Ramírez
 Roney Salinas
 Nicholas Anderson
 Ojay Duhaney
 Jassett Kerr
 Miguel Hernández
 Michel Morales
 Alberto Morin
 Henri Pupiro
 Geovany García
 David Morán
 Juan Francisco Zumba
 Djibril Camará
 Zachari Zeegelaar
 Caleb Wales
 Frank Anderson
 Kyle Atkins
 Logan Brown
 Kathryn Nesbitt
 Corey Parker

Video assistant referees

 David Gantar
 Carlos Ayala
 Arturo Cruz
 Leon Barajas
 Erick Miranda
 Angel Monroy
 Joel Rangel
 Tatiana Guzmán
 Allen Chapman
 Tim Ford
 Edvin Jurisevic
 Chris Penso

Targeted advanced referee program (TARP)

 Pierre-Luc Lauzière
 Keylor Herrera
 Benjamin Pineda
 Diego Montaño
 José Torres
 Tristley Bassue 
 Nima Saghafi
 Rubiel Vazquez

Group stage
The match schedule was announced on May 13, 2021.

All match times listed are EDT (UTC−4), as listed by CONCACAF. If the venue was located in a different time zone, the local time is also given.

Tiebreakers
The ranking of teams in the group stage was determined as follows:
 Points obtained in all group matches (three points for a win, one for a draw, none for a defeat);
 Goal difference in all group matches;
 Number of goals scored in all group matches;
 Points obtained in the matches played between the teams in question;
 Goal difference in the matches played between the teams in question;
 Number of goals scored in the matches played between the teams in question;
 Fair play points in all group matches (only one deduction could be applied to a player in a single match): 
 Drawing of lots.

Group A

Group B

Group C

Group D

Knockout stage

In the knockout stage, if a match was level at the end of normal playing time, extra time was played (two periods of 15 minutes each), with each team being allowed to make a sixth substitution. If still tied after extra time, the match was decided by a penalty shoot-out.

As with every tournament since 2005 (except 2015), there was no third place play-off.

All match times listed are EDT (UTC−4), as listed by CONCACAF. If the venue was located in a different time zone, the local time is also given.

Bracket

Quarter-finals

Semi-finals

Final

Statistics

Goalscorers

Awards
The following awards were given at the conclusion of the tournament.
Golden Ball Award:  Héctor Herrera
Golden Boot Award:  Almoez Ali
Golden Glove Award:  Matt Turner
Young Player Award:  Tajon Buchanan
Goal of the Tournament:  Bobby Decordova-Reid (against )
Fighting Spirit Award:  Bryan Tamacas
Fair Play Award: 

Best XI
The following players were chosen as the tournament's best eleven.

Prize money
Each team received a participation fee of $200,000, with the runners-up earning $500,000 and the winners earning $1 million.

Marketing

Logo and slogan
The official logo was unveiled on September 28, 2020, during the final draw in Miami, Florida. The official slogan of the tournament was "This Is Ours".

Match ball
Flight by Nike was the tournament's official match ball.

Official songs and anthems
 
"All Things (Just Keep Getting Better)" by Canadian musicians Widelife and Simone Denny, and "Cool" by Irish singer-songwriter Samantha Mumba, served as the two official songs of the tournament. Mumba's first singles "Baby Come on Over" and "Gotta Tell You" were initially selected but were replaced as Mumba's previous label Polydor rejected the usage.

"Glorious" by English-Canadian girl group All Saints served as the official anthem of the tournament.

"Fútbol a la Gente" by Puerto Rican singer Guaynaa and Mexican cumbia group Los Ángeles Azules, and "Pa'lante" by Colombian singer Lao Ra and Dominican DJ Happy Colors, served as the two official Spanish-language songs of the tournament, the former being selected by Univision as part of their coverage.

"Juega" was the official Spanish anthem, by Colombian duo Cali y El Dandee featuring Jamaican singer Charly Black.

Sponsorship
The following were announced as global sponsors of the tournament:
Allstate
Angry Orchard
Chick-fil-A
Grubhub
Cerveza Modelo de México
MGM Resorts
Nike, Inc.
Qatar Airways
Scotiabank
Toyota
Valvoline

Broadcasting rights

Notes

References

External links

 
2021
Gold Cup
July 2021 sports events in the United States
August 2021 sports events in the United States
International association football competitions hosted by the United States
2021 in American soccer